Giovanni de Martino (3/13 January 1870 – 3 March 1935) was an Italian sculptor. He made sentimental bronzes, often of street boys, fishermen or women.

De Martino was born in Naples on 3 or 13 January 1870, and studied at the Reale Istituto di Belle Arti there, under Gioacchino Toma and Stanislao Lista.

He spent some time in Paris, where he made small groups of figures. In 1900 he won a prize at the Salon de Paris for a bronze of a fisherman. After his return to Naples his work tended towards social realism.

He died in Naples on 3 March 1935.

Art market
At a Sotheby's New York auction in 2008, Giovanni De Martino 's Fishermen (1930), a bronze sculpture, was sold for 7.500 US Dollars plus auction fees.

References

1870 births
1935 deaths
Artists from Naples
19th-century Italian sculptors
Italian male sculptors
20th-century Italian sculptors
20th-century Italian male artists
19th-century Italian male artists